Black Lake (Montenegrin: Crno jezero) is a lake in the Municipality of Žabljak in northern Montenegro.

It is a glacial lake, located on Mount Durmitor, at an elevation of 1,416 m. It is 3 km from the town of Žabljak.

Geography
Black Lake lies at the foot of Međed Peak and has an area of 0.515 square km. The lake consists of two smaller lakes: Big Lake (Veliko jezero) and Little Lake (Malo jezero). The lakes are connected by a narrow strait that dries up during the summer, creating two separate bodies of water.
 Big Lake has an area of 0.338 square km, maximum depth of 24.5 m, maximum length of 855 m, and maximum width of 615 m.
 Little Lake has an area of 0.177 square km, maximum depth of 49.1 m, maximum length of 605 m, and maximum width around 400 m.

The maximum length of Black Lake is 1,155 m. Little Lake actually has a greater volume because it is deeper.

Black Lake is filled by numerous mountain streams, the best known being Mlin Creek. Other streams have no name because they appear periodically, when snow from Mount Durmitor is melting.

Tourism
Black Lake is the premium tourist attraction of the Durmitor area. It is the largest and the best known of 18 glacial lakes on the mountain. The lake is easily accessible, as it is within walking distance from the center of the town of Žabljak.

A 3.5 km walking path circles around entire lake, and it is a popular destination for recreation and hiking. Many mountain trails lead from it to other smaller lakes around Žabljak. The Katun restaurant is located on the shore of the lake and serves traditional Montenegrin dishes.

References

Lakes of Montenegro
Glacial lakes